Aimo Cajander's second cabinet was the 10th Government of Finland. The cabinet existed from January 18, 1924 to May 31, 1924. It was a caretaker government, and its Prime Minister was Aimo Cajander.

Ministers

References

Cajander, 2
1924 establishments in Finland
1924 disestablishments in Finland
Cabinets established in 1924
Cabinets disestablished in 1924